Richard Allen White (born December 23, 1968) is a former Major League Baseball relief pitcher. White spent parts of 12 seasons in the majors, working primarily as a relief pitcher. He batted and threw right-handed.

Playing career
After graduating from Kenton Ridge High School in Springfield, Ohio, White attended Paducah Community College. He was drafted by the Pirates in the 15th round of the  June draft, with the 403rd overall pick. After signing quickly, he made his professional debut with the Pirates' affiliate in the Gulf Coast League that fall.

The Mets acquired White and outfielder Bubba Trammell in exchange for pitcher Paul Wilson and outfielder Jason Tyner. The Mets advanced to the World Series that season, but lost to the New York Yankees in five games.

On June 23, the Philadelphia Phillies claimed White off waivers from the Cincinnati Reds. On February 2, the Houston Astros signed White to a minor-league contract. On June 29, 2007, the Astros released White after some ineffective outings. As a reliever for Houston, he was lights out with amazing numbers through Spring Training, allowing him to make the club. April was good for him; going 11.2 innings with 2 ER for an ERA of 1.54. But after going on the disabled list, he had an ERA of 11.72, giving up 23 ER over 17.2 innings. With Houston, White appeared in 23 games, going 1-0 with a 7.67 ERA in 29 innings. On August 5, 2007, the Seattle Mariners signed him and assigned White to Triple-A Tacoma. On August 23, 2007, White was promoted to the majors, but was placed on waivers and subsequently released by the Mariners on September 6.

White throws four pitches: a fastball, a slider, a curveball, and a forkball.

During pre-game warmups on May 12, he and pitcher Jim Mecir were involved in a serious collision in the outfield while chasing a fly ball in batting practice. White was unhurt, but Mecir broke his elbow and missed the rest of the season.

Coaching career
White was named pitching coach of the Clark State Eagles in 2022.

References

External links

1968 births
Living people
Major League Baseball pitchers
Augusta Pirates players
Buffalo Bisons (minor league) players
Calgary Cannons players
Carolina Mudcats players
Chicago White Sox players
Cincinnati Reds players
Cleveland Indians players
Colorado Rockies players
Colorado Springs Sky Sox players
Corpus Christi Hooks players
Durham Bulls players
Houston Astros players
Las Vegas 51s players
Memphis Redbirds players
New York Mets players
Orlando Rays players
Pittsburgh Pirates players
Salem Buccaneers players
St. Louis Cardinals players
Tampa Bay Devil Rays players
Philadelphia Phillies players
Seattle Mariners players
Tacoma Rainiers players
Welland Pirates players
Baseball players from Ohio
Sportspeople from Springfield, Ohio
Baseball coaches from Ohio
Clark State Eagles baseball coaches